Saint-Vrain is a commune in the Essonne department in Île-de-France in northern France.

Inhabitants of Saint-Vrain are known as Saint-Vrainois.

Since 2001, Thaxted (Essex, England) has been twinned with Saint-Vrain. A twinning association aims to promote friendship and cultural understanding and to foster the relationship between the two towns and their people.

Geography
The Juine forms the commune's southeastern border.

Structures and monuments
A castle with a historic zoological park (with reconstructions of prehistoric scenes) is located here, but has been closed to the public since 1998.  The town also has a Louis XV-era obelisk and a thirteenth-century church.

See also
Communes of the Essonne department

References

External links

Official website 

Mayors of Essonne Association 

Communes of Essonne
Châteaux in Essonne